Nadëb or Kaburi is a Nadahup language of the Brazilian Amazon, along the Uneiuxi, Japura, and Negro rivers. Various names for it include Nadöbö, Xïriwai, Hahöb, Guariba/Wariwa, Kaborí, Anodöub, sometimes compounded with the term Maku, as in Maku do Paraná Boá-Boá after one of the rivers in Nadëb territory.

Phonology 

All vowels except for /e, ɤ, o/ have nasalized counterparts.

Consonants

References

External links
 Nadëb basic lexicon at the Global Lexicostatistical Database

Languages of Brazil
Nadahup languages
Object–subject–verb languages